Brooke's squirrel (Sundasciurus brookei) is a species of rodent in the family Sciuridae. It is found in Indonesia and Malaysia. Its natural habitat is subtropical or tropical dry forests. It is threatened by habitat loss. It was named for Charles Brooke, the second White Rajah of Sarawak by Oldfield Thomas from a specimen collected by Charles Hose on Mt Dulit.

References

Thorington, R. W. Jr. and R. S. Hoffman. 2005. Family Sciuridae. pp. 754–818 in Mammal Species of the World a Taxonomic and Geographic Reference. D. E. Wilson and D. M. Reeder eds. Johns Hopkins University Press, Baltimore.

Sundasciurus
Endemic fauna of Borneo
Rodents of Indonesia
Rodents of Malaysia
Mammals of Borneo
Mammals described in 1892
Taxa named by Oldfield Thomas
Taxonomy articles created by Polbot